Giuseppe Ghezzi (November 6, 1634–1721) was an Italian painter of the Baroque period, active mainly in Rome.

Biography
Born in Comunanza, in the  Marche (then part of the Papal States), he was the son of the painter Sebastiano Ghezzi, a painter and architect for the papacy of Pope Urban VIII. Sebastiano died when Giuseppe was only 11 years old, and he was sent to Fermo to study philosophy an letters, but took also painting instruction under Lorenzino da Fermo. He then moved to Rome where he chose painting over law studies. He painted in many Roman churches.

He painted in the style of Pietro da Cortona. Giuseppe Ghezzi was the first secretary in perpetuity for the Accademia di San Luca in Rome. He was the father of the more prominent caricaturist Pier Leone Ghezzi (born June 28, 1674). Another son, Placido, was Apostolic Protonotary. Giuseppe was also a mentor to Pietro da Pietri (1634–1721).

On December 10, 1676, he borrowed a number of privately owned works by Venetian masters and exhibited them in the cloisters of San Salvatore in Lauro in Rome. He published a book of collected poems about art that describes an academic competition.

Ghezzi died in Rome in 1721. Among his disciples was a Pietro di Pietri of Novara.

References

Sources

External links

1634 births
1721 deaths
People from the Province of Ascoli Piceno
Italian Baroque painters
17th-century Italian painters
Italian male painters
18th-century Italian painters
18th-century Italian male artists